Acraga boliviana is a moth in the family Dalceridae. It was described by Walter Hopp in 1921. It is found in Bolivia and western Brazil. The habitat consists of subtropical moist forests.

Adults have been recorded on wing in July.

References

Moths described in 1921
Dalceridae